Dominic Ayodele Solanke-Mitchell (born 14 September 1997), known as Dominic Solanke, is an English professional footballer who plays as a forward for  side AFC Bournemouth.

Solanke started his career with Chelsea, making his first-team debut in October 2014. He spent the 2015–16 season on loan with Vitesse in the Eredivisie. He signed for Liverpool in July 2017, making 27 appearances before joining AFC Bournemouth in January 2019.

Solanke has represented England at all youth, under-21 and senior levels. He has won the 2014 UEFA European Under-17 Championship and the 2017 FIFA U-20 World Cup with his country and received the Golden Ball award for best player in the latter tournament. He made one appearance for the England national team in 2017.

Early life
Solanke was born in Reading, Berkshire to a Nigerian Yoruba father and an English mother. He attended Brighton Hill Community College in Basingstoke.

Club career

Chelsea

Early career
Solanke started his career with Chelsea in 2004 in their under-eight team. During the 2013–14 season, Solanke scored 20 goals in 25 appearances for the under-18 team. On 6 May 2014, he scored two late goals as Chelsea came from two goals down to beat local rivals Fulham 7–6 on aggregate in the FA Youth Cup Final. On 29 July 2014, José Mourinho stated a belief that he should blame himself were Solanke not to become a senior England international under his management, and indicated that the player would train with the first-team squad during the 2014–15 season.

2014–15 season

Solanke signed his first professional contract with Chelsea in September 2014. Due to the injury of Diego Costa, Solanke was named on the bench for a Premier League match against Crystal Palace on 18 October 2014. Three days later, he made his first-team debut as a substitute for Oscar in the 73rd minute of a 6–0 win over NK Maribor in the UEFA Champions League. This made him the youngest player to debut in the UEFA Champions League for Chelsea.

He finished as top scorer in the group stages of the UEFA Youth League after scoring a hat-trick in the final group stage match against Sporting CP. On 10 April 2015, Solanke scored two goals in the semi-final of the 2014–15 UEFA Youth League against Roma to send Chelsea into the final. He scored in the 3–2 win over Shakhtar Donetsk in the UEFA Youth League final, ending the tournament with 12 goals in nine appearances as Chelsea won the title. On 20 April 2015, Solanke scored a late goal to give the team side a 3–1 win in the first leg of the FA Youth Cup final against Manchester City. He played in the 2–1 win in the second leg, as Chelsea won the final 5–2 on aggregate. On 7 May 2015, Solanke reached 41 goals for the season after scoring a hat-trick in a 4–3 victory over Liverpool U21. He was awarded the inaugural Chelsea Academy Player of the Year award for the 2014–15 season.

2015–16 season: Loan to Vitesse
On 4 August 2015, Solanke joined Eredivisie club Vitesse on a season-long loan to gain first-team experience. After getting approval from FIFA to play in the Netherlands, he made his debut on 23 August 2015, coming off the bench in the 79th minute against Feyenoord, the match ending in a 2–0 defeat for Vitesse. A week later, Solanke scored his first goal in a 4–1 victory over SC Cambuur after coming off the bench with 15 minutes to go. He ended the season with seven goals in 25 appearances, just three behind top scorer Valeri Qazaishvili and one behind runner-up Milot Rashica.

2016–17 season
After rejecting many loan offers from several clubs, Solanke was retained as Chelsea's third-choice striker behind Diego Costa and Michy Batshuayi for the first half of the 2016–17 season. On 23 August 2016, he was involved in Chelsea's matchday squad for the first time since returning from his loan at Vitesse, for their EFL Cup home tie against Bristol Rovers. He remained as an unused substitute in Chelsea's 3–2 victory. In February 2017, Chelsea manager Antonio Conte confirmed that it was likely that Solanke would leave the club in the summer upon the expiry of his contract.

Liverpool
On 30 May 2017, Solanke agreed to sign for Premier League club Liverpool on 1 July upon the expiration of his Chelsea contract. He was officially confirmed as a Liverpool player on 10 July 2017, with Liverpool expected to pay a tribunal-set fee of around £3 million. He made his debut for the club on 16 August 2017, coming on as a substitute for Roberto Firmino in a 2–1 UEFA Champions League first-leg win over Hoffenheim. His first Premier League start for Liverpool came on 30 November in a 3–0 win over Stoke City at the Bet365 Stadium. He scored his first Liverpool goal on 13 May 2018, the final day of the 2017–18 season, in the 4–0 home victory against Brighton & Hove Albion.

AFC Bournemouth
Solanke signed for fellow Premier League club AFC Bournemouth on 4 January 2019 on a long-term contract for an undisclosed fee, reported by BBC Sport as £19 million. He made his debut on 2 February in a 2–0 away loss against Cardiff City in the league.

Solanke scored his first and second Premier League goals for Bournemouth in his 39th league appearance on 12 July 2020, a 4–1 win over Leicester City. He then netted in Bournemouth's 3–1 victory at Everton on the final day of the league season but it was not enough to save the club from relegation to the Championship.

Solanke scored fifteen goals in the Championship during the 2020–21 season, finishing as the club’s joint top goal scorer in the league along with Arnaut Danjuma.

International career
Solanke has represented England at all youth levels. In May 2014, Solanke was part of the under-17 team that won the 2014 UEFA European Under-17 Championship. He was the tournament's joint top scorer with four goals in four appearances, a brace against Turkey, a goal in the semi-final secured a place in the final, and England's goal in the final.

In January 2015, Solanke was named the England Men's Youth Player of the Year for 2014. In March 2015, Solanke collected his trophy and was invited to train with the senior England squad. He was named in the under-19 squad for the 2016 UEFA European Under-19 Championship.

Solanke was named in the under-20 squad for the 2017 FIFA U-20 World Cup. He scored four goals in the tournament; in the quarter-final, he scored the only goal against Mexico as England advanced into the semi-final, and scored twice in the semi-final as England beat Italy 3–1 to reach the final. Solanke started as England beat Venezuela 1–0 in the final. Solanke was awarded the Golden Ball as the player of the tournament.

Solanke was called up by the senior team for the first time in November 2017 for a friendly against Brazil at Wembley Stadium. He came on as a 75th-minute substitute in a 0–0 draw.

On 27 May 2019, Solanke was included in England's 23-man squad for the 2019 UEFA European Under-21 Championship.

Style of play
Solanke primarily plays as a striker, although can also operate as either an attacking midfielder or a winger. Former Chelsea striker Tore André Flo has said that Solanke "works really hard", has "got very good physique" and "a great touch on the ball". He went on to say: "He's quick but often what impresses me the most is when he looks like he's lost the ball, he somehow manages to get out with the ball, no matter how tight the situation is or how difficult it looks".

Career statistics

Club

International

Honours
Chelsea Youth
FA Youth Cup: 2013–14, 2014–15
UEFA Youth League: 2014–15

Liverpool
UEFA Champions League runner-up: 2017–18

AFC Bournemouth
Championship runner-up: 2021–22

England U17
UEFA European Under-17 Championship: 2014

England U20
FIFA U-20 World Cup: 2017

Individual
Chelsea Academy Player of the Year: 2014–15
England Men's Youth Player of the Year: 2014
FIFA U-20 World Cup Golden Ball: 2017
EFL Championship Team of the Season: 2021–22
PFA Team of the Year: 2021–22 Championship

References

External links

Profile at the AFC Bournemouth website

1997 births
Living people
Sportspeople from Reading, Berkshire
Footballers from Berkshire
English footballers
Association football forwards
Chelsea F.C. players
SBV Vitesse players
Liverpool F.C. players
AFC Bournemouth players
Eredivisie players
Premier League players
English Football League players
England youth international footballers
England under-21 international footballers
England international footballers
English expatriate footballers
Expatriate footballers in the Netherlands
English expatriate sportspeople in the Netherlands
Black British sportspeople
English people of Nigerian descent